Mattia Pozzo (born 26 January 1989) is an Italian former professional racing cyclist.

Major results
2008
1st Stage 3 Giro della Valle d'Aosta
2011
1st Trofeo Edil C
2012
1st Stage 9 Giro Ciclistico d'Italia
2013
1st Prologue & Stage 3 Tour de Kumano
2014
1st  Turkish Beauties Classification, Tour of Turkey

References

External links

 
 
 

1989 births
Living people
Italian male cyclists
People from Biella
Cyclists from Piedmont
Sportspeople from the Province of Biella